Rajec is a town in the Žilina District, Žilina Region in northern Slovakia.

Etymology
Rajec, Rajčianka, Rajčanka are derived from Proto-Slavic appelative *rajь – a wet, muddy place (modern Slovak raj – a paradise, "a place with rich vegetation").

History
The first written record about Rajec was in 1193 as Raich, in a document issued by King Béla III. The first mention as a town comes from 1397.

Geography

Demographics
According to the 2001 census, the town had 6,074 inhabitants. 98.86% of inhabitants were Slovaks and 0.68% Czechs. The religious make-up was 92.79% Roman Catholics, 3.42% people with no religious affiliation and 1.89% Lutherans.

Sightseeings

 Town Hall, renaissance one-floor building available from all sides. Open arcades served like market. On the second floor, there were administrative rooms of town council. After the newest reconstruction in 1992, the arcades are full glassed and the town hall serve as wedding, concert and exhibition room. (3D Model)
  Town museum, former brewery residence

Twin towns — sister cities

Rajec is twinned with:
 Czechowice-Dziedzice, Poland
 Kęty, Poland
 Krnov, Czech Republic
 Rýmařov, Czech Republic

References

External links

 Town website

Cities and towns in Slovakia